Larry Anderson may refer to:

Larry Anderson (actor) (born 1952), American actor and magician
Larry Anderson (baseball) (born 1952), former MLB pitcher
Larry Anderson (American football) (born 1956), former NFL player
Larry J. Anderson (born 1947), American virologist
Larry Anderson (basketball), American basketball coach
Larry Anderson, author of a 2002 biography of Benton MacKaye
Larry Anderson, American actor known for the 2004 reality television special Seriously, Dude, I'm Gay

See also 

Lawrence Anderson (disambiguation)
Larry Andersen (born 1953), American baseball pitcher and color commentator